The 1955 season was the 25th completed season of Finnish Football League Championship, known as the Mestaruussarja.

Overview
The Mestaruussarja was administered by the Finnish Football Association and the competition's 1955 season was contested by 10 teams. KIF Helsinki won the championship and the two lowest placed teams of the competition, TuTo Turku and KoRe Kotka, were relegated to the Suomensarja.

League standings

Results

See also
Suomen Cup 1955

Footnotes

References
Finland - List of final tables (RSSSF)

Mestaruussarja seasons
Fin
Fin
1